Bambarakanda Falls (also known as Bambarakele Falls) is the tallest waterfall in Sri Lanka. The waterfall was formed by Kuda Oya, which is a tributary of the Walawe River. The Bambarakanda Falls can be found in a forest of pine trees.

See also 
 List of waterfalls in Sri Lanka

Notes

References

Further reading

 

Waterfalls of Sri Lanka
Landforms of Badulla District
Waterfalls in Uva Province